Abdullah Abdulrazaq Mayouf (born 22 May 1960) is a Kuwaiti diver. He competed in the men's 10 metre platform event at the 1980 Summer Olympics.

References

External links
 

1960 births
Living people
Kuwaiti male divers
Olympic divers of Kuwait
Divers at the 1980 Summer Olympics
Place of birth missing (living people)